The 2005 Amílcar Cabral Cup was held in Conakry, Guinea at the Stade du 28 Septembre. The winner was Guinea, which beat Senegal 1-0.

Group stage

Group A

Group B

Senegal was placed first by drawing lot.

Knockout stage

Semifinals

Third place match

Final

References
 

2005
Ami
Foo